The Grenadier Guards (GREN GDS) is an infantry regiment of the British Army. It can trace its lineage back to 1656 when Lord Wentworth's Regiment was raised in Bruges to protect the exiled Charles II. In 1665, this regiment was combined with John Russell's Regiment of Guards to form the current regiment, known as the 1st Regiment of Foot Guards. Since then, the regiment has filled both a ceremonial and protective role as well as an operational one. In 1900, the regiment provided a cadre of personnel to form the Irish Guards; while later, in 1915 it also provided the basis of the Welsh Guards upon their formation.

The regiment's early history saw it take part in numerous conflicts including the War of the Spanish Succession, the War of the Austrian Succession, the Seven Years' War, and the Napoleonic Wars; at the end of this period the regiment was granted the "Grenadier" designation by a Royal Proclamation. During the Victorian era, the regiment took part in the Crimean War, the Anglo-Egyptian War, the Mahdist War, and the Second Boer War.

During the First World War, the Grenadier Guards was expanded from three battalions to five, of which four served on the Western Front, while later during the Second World War, six battalions were raised, and several were converted to an armoured role as part of the Guards Armoured Division. These units fought in France, North-West Europe, North Africa and Italy.

After the Second World War the regiment was reduced first to three battalions, then to two, and finally to one battalion in the mid-1990s. Major deployments during this time have included operations in Palestine, Malaya, Cyprus, Northern Ireland, the Gulf War, Afghanistan and Iraq.

History

The Grenadier Guards trace their lineage back to 1656, when Lord Wentworth's Regiment was raised from gentlemen of the Honourable Artillery Company by the then heir to the throne, Prince Charles (later King Charles II), in Bruges, in the Spanish Netherlands (present-day Belgium), where it formed a part of the exiled King's bodyguard. A few years later, a similar regiment known as John Russell's Regiment of Guards was formed. In 1665, these two regiments were combined to form the 1st Regiment of Foot Guards, consisting of 24 companies of men. Since then the Grenadier Guards have served ten Kings and four Queens, including Queen Elizabeth II. Throughout the 18th century, the regiment took part in a number of campaigns including the War of Spanish Succession, the War of Austrian Succession and the Seven Years' War. At the end of the Napoleonic Wars, the regiment gained the name "Grenadier" in July 1815 following a Royal Proclamation.

During the Victorian era, the regiment took part in the Crimean War, participating in the fighting at the Alma river, Inkerman, and Sevastopol. For their involvement in the Crimean War, four members of the 3rd Battalion received the Victoria Cross. Later the regiment fought at Battle of Tel el-Kebir during the Anglo-Egyptian War in 1882, and then the Mahdist War in Sudan, both during the 1885 Suakin Expedition and in 1898, at the Battle of Omdurman. During the Second Boer War, the 2nd and 3rd Battalions were deployed to South Africa, where they took part in a number of battles including the Battle of Modder River and the Battle of Belmont, as well as a number of smaller actions. In 1900, seventy-five men from the regiment were used to raise a fourth Guards regiment, known as the Irish Guards in honour of the role that Irish regiments had played in the fighting in South Africa.

First World War

At the outbreak of the First World War in August 1914, the regiment consisted of three battalions and the regiment's commanding officer was Colonel Henry Streatfeild. With the commencement of hostilities, the regiment raised a service battalion, the 4th Battalion, and a reserve battalion, known as the 5th (Reserve) Battalion, which was used to carry out ceremonial duties in London and Windsor during the war. The 2nd Battalion of the regiment was sent to France in August, and the 1st Battalion followed to Belgium in October. They took part in the early stages of the fighting during the period known as "Race to the Sea", during which time they were involved significantly at the First Battle of Ypres. In February 1915, a fifth Guards regiment was raised, known as The Welsh Guards. In recognition of the significant contribution Welshmen had made to The Grenadier Guards, the regiment transferred five officers and 634 other ranks to the newly formed unit. A short time later, permission was received for the formation of the Guards Division, the brainchild of Lord Kitchener, and on 18 August 1915, the division came into existence, consisting of three brigades, each with four battalions. Following this the four service battalions of the regiment fought in a number of significant battles including Loos, the Somme, Cambrai, Arras and the Hindenburg Line. Seven members of the regiment received the Victoria Cross during the war.

Following the Armistice with Germany in November 1918, the regiment returned to just three battalions, which were used in a variety of roles, serving at home in the United Kingdom, as well as in France, Turkey and Egypt.

Second World War
During the Second World War, the regiment was expanded to six service battalions, with the re-raising of the 4th Battalion, and the establishment of the 5th and 6th Battalions. The Grenadier Guards' first involvement in the war came in the early stages of the fighting when all three regular battalions were sent to France in late 1939 as part of the British Expeditionary Force (BEF). The 1st and 2nd Battalions were serving in the 7th Guards Brigade, which also included the 1st Battalion, Coldstream Guards, and were part of the 3rd Infantry Division, led by Major General Bernard Montgomery. The 3rd Battalion was in the 1st Guards Brigade attached to the 1st Infantry Division, commanded by Major General Harold Alexander. As the BEF was pushed back by the German blitzkrieg during the battles of France and Dunkirk, these battalions played a considerable role in maintaining the British Army's reputation during the withdrawal phase of the campaign before being themselves evacuated from Dunkirk. After this, they returned to the United Kingdom, where they undertook defensive duties in anticipation of a possible German invasion. Between October 1940 and October 1941, the regiment raised the 4th, 5th, and 6th Battalions. Later, in the summer of 1941, there was a need to increase the number of armoured and motorised units in the British Army and as a result many infantry battalions were converted into armoured regiments; the 2nd and 4th Battalions were re-equipped with tanks, while the 1st Battalion was motorised. The 1st and 2nd (Armoured) Battalions were part of the 5th Guards Armoured Brigade, attached to the Guards Armoured Division, and the 4th Battalion was part of the 6th Guards Tank Brigade Group. They subsequently served in the North West Europe Campaign of 1944–45, taking part in several actions, including the Battle for Caen, particularly in Operation Goodwood, as well as Operation Market Garden, the Battle of the Bulge and Operation Veritable.

The 3rd, 5th and 6th Battalions served in the North African Campaign and in the final stages of the Tunisia Campaign, under command of the British First Army, where they fought significant battles in the Medjez-el-Bab and along the Mareth Line. The battalions took part in the Italian Campaign at Salerno, Monte Camino, Anzio, Monte Cassino, and along the Gothic Line. The 3rd Battalion, still with the 1st Guards Brigade, was attached to the 78th Battleaxe Infantry Division for two months in Tunisia until it was exchanged for the 38th (Irish) Brigade and became part of the 6th Armoured Division, where it would remain for the rest of the war. The 5th Battalion was part of 24th Guards Brigade and served with the 1st Division during the Battle of Anzio. After suffering devastating casualties, the brigade was relieved in March 1944 . The 6th Battalion served with the 22nd Guards Brigade, later redesignated 201st Guards Motor Brigade, until late 1944 when the battalion was disbanded due to an acute shortage of Guards replacements. During the course of the conflict, two men of the regiment were awarded the Victoria Cross. They were Lance Corporal Harry Nicholls of the 3rd Battalion, during the Battle of Dunkirk, and Major William Sidney of the 5th Battalion during the Battle of Anzio in March 1944.

After the Second World War

In June 1945, following the end of hostilities, the 2nd and 4th Battalions gave up their tanks and returned to an infantry role. The regiment returned to three battalions at this time, with the 4th and 5th Battalions being disbanded along with the 6th, which had been removed from the order of battle before the end of the war. Initially, the regiment was employed on occupation duties in Germany; however, the 3rd Battalion was deployed shortly afterwards to Palestine, where it attempted to keep the peace until May 1948, when it was replaced by the 1st Battalion. Further deployments came to Malaya in 1949, Tripoli in 1951 and Cyprus in 1956. In 1960, shortly after returning from Cyprus, the 3rd Battalion paraded for the last time and was subsequently placed in suspended animation. In order to maintain the battalion's customs and traditions, one of its companies, the Inkerman Company, was incorporated into the 1st Battalion.

Since the mid-1960s, the 1st and 2nd Battalions have been deployed to Africa, South America and Northern Ireland where they undertook peacekeeping duties. They also undertook duties as part of the NATO force stationed in Germany during the Cold War. In 1991, the 1st Battalion, which had been serving in Germany, was deployed to the Middle East, where it took part in the Persian Gulf War mounted in Warrior armoured personnel carriers, before returning for a six-month tour of Northern Ireland.

In 1994, under the Options for Change reforms, The Grenadier Guards was reduced to a single battalion. The 2nd Battalion was put into 'suspended animation', and its colours passed for safekeeping to a newly formed independent company, which was named "The Nijmegen Company". As a result of this, the regiment was reduced to its current composition: one full battalion, the 1st Battalion, consisting of three rifle companies (The Queen's Company, Number Two Company and Inkerman Company), a support company and a headquarters company, based at Wellington Barracks, London, and one independent company, The Nijmegen Company. The Queen, as Colonel-in-Chief, presented new colours to the Nijmegen Company in 2013.

In recent years, the 1st Battalion has deployed as part of Operation Telic in Iraq, and Operation Herrick in Afghanistan. In 2020, during the COVID-19 pandemic, members of the regiment helped assist the NHS for testing of COVID-19 patients, and provided checkpoints throughout London in collaboration with the Royal Anglian Regiment.

Following the Integrated Review  G (Guards) Company, London Regiment at Kingston upon Thames re-badged and became Ypres Company, Grenadier Guards.

King's Company

The King's Company of The Grenadier Guards traditionally provides the pallbearers for all deceased monarchs, as all soldiers within the company are over the height of six feet.

Battle honours
The 1st Foot Guards has received 78 battle honours, gained for its involvement in a number of conflicts including:
 the War of the Spanish Succession, (1701–1714) including Oudenarde
 the War of the Austrian Succession (1740–1748)
 the Napoleonic Wars, including the Peninsular War (1808–1814) and the Battle of Waterloo (1815)
 the Crimean War (1854–1855)
 the Egyptian War (1882)
 the Sudan Campaigns of 1885 and 1898
 the Second Boer War (1889–1902)
 the First World War (Western Front) (1914–1918)
 the Second World War (North Africa, Italy, Northwest Europe) (1939–1945)
 the Persian Gulf War (1990–1991)

Training

Recruits to the Guards Division go through a gruelling thirty-week training programme at the Infantry Training Centre (ITC). The training is two weeks longer than the training for the Regular line infantry regiments of the British Army; the extra training, carried out throughout the course, is devoted to drill and ceremonies.

Colonels-in-Chief
The Grenadier Guards' various colonels-in-chief have generally been the British monarchs, including Edward VII, George V, Edward VIII, George VI, Elizabeth II and Charles III.

Regimental Colonels
The following is a list of individuals who have served in the role of colonel of the regiment:

 Thomas Wentworth, 5th Baron Wentworth (1656);
 Hon. John Russell (1660);
 Henry Fitzroy, 1st Duke of Grafton (1681);
 Edward Lee, 1st Earl of Lichfield (1688);
 Henry Fitzroy, 1st Duke of Grafton (1688);
 Henry Sydney, 1st Earl of Romney (1689);
 Charles Schomberg, 2nd Duke of Schomberg (1690);
 Henry Sydney, 1st Earl of Romney (1693);
 John Churchill, 1st Duke of Marlborough (1704);
 James Butler, 2nd Duke of Ormonde (1712);
 John Churchill, 1st Duke of Marlborough (1714);
 William Cadogan, 1st Earl Cadogan (1722);
 Sir Charles Wills (1726);
 Prince William, Duke of Cumberland (1742);
 John Ligonier, 1st Earl Ligonier (1757);
 Prince William Henry, Duke of Gloucester and Edinburgh (1770);
 Prince Frederick, Duke of York and Albany (1805);
 Arthur Wellesley, 1st Duke of Wellington (1827);
 Albert, Prince Consort (1852);
 Prince George, Duke of Cambridge (1861);
 Prince Arthur, Duke of Connaught and Strathearn (1904);
 Princess Elizabeth (1942);
 George Jeffreys, 1st Baron Jeffreys (1952);
 Sir Allan Henry Shafto Adair (1960);
 Prince Philip, Duke of Edinburgh (1975);
 Prince Andrew, Duke of York (2017);
 Camilla, Queen Consort (2022).

Regimental Lieutenant Colonels

The Regimental Lieutenant Colonels have included:

Marches

The Regimental Slow March is the march Scipio, from the opera of the same name by George Frideric Handel, inspired by the exploits of the Roman General Scipio Africanus. The first performance of Scipio was in 1726. Handel actually composed the eponymous slow march for the First Guards, presenting it to the regiment before he added it to the score of the opera. The Quick March is The British Grenadiers.

Alliances
 – HMS Illustrious (until 2014)
 – HMS Queen Elizabeth
 – The Canadian Grenadier Guards
 – 1st Battalion, Royal Australian Regiment
 – Worshipful Company of Ironmongers

Lineage

|- style="text-align: center; background: #F08080;"
| style="text-align:center;" colspan="2"|Lineage
|- style="text-align:center;"
| rowspan="2" style="width:25%; "| 1st Regiment of Foot Guards(later Grenadier Guards)
| style="width:25%; "| The Royal Regiment of Guards
|-
| style="width:25%; text-align:center;"| John Russell's Regiment of Guards

Order of precedence
The Grenadier Guards is the most senior regiment of the Infantry in the British Army

See also
James Ashworth
George Higginson
Grenadier Guards Band
Military history of the United Kingdom
British Army
Canadian Grenadier Guards

Notes
Footnotes

Citations

References

External links

Main Website on British Army Website
Regimental website
The Guards Museum Containing the history of the five regiments of Foot Guards, Wellington Barracks, London.
British Army site about the GG.
Grenadier Guards Association (East Kent Branch)
Grenadier Guards Association (Nottinghamshire Branch)
Grenadier Guards Association (Bristol Branch)
Melody and words of "The British Grenadiers" (the Regimental Quick March)
British Army Locations from 1945

 
1656 establishments in England
British ceremonial units
Grenadier regiments
Guards regiments
Infantry regiments of the British Army
Regiments of the British Army in the Crimean War
Regiments of the British Army in World War I
Regiments of the British Army in World War II
Military units and formations of the United Kingdom in the War in Afghanistan (2001–2021)
Military units and formations of the Gulf War
Military units and formations of the Iraq War
Military units and formations established in 1656